Lophocera is a genus of snout moths described by George Hamilton Kenrick in 1917.

Palpi are upturned, the third joint well developed and acute, proboscis present; antennae pectinated (comb like) in the male, with a bunch in the middle.

The species of this genus are all known only from Madagascar. The forewings are brown blackish with a yellow spot in the cell. Hindwing orange yellow, bordered blackish.

Species
 Lophocera flavifusalis Marion & Viette, 1956
 Lophocera flavipuncta Kenrick, 1917
 Lophocera vadonalis Marion & Viette, 1956

References

Pyralinae
Pyralidae genera
Taxa named by George Hamilton Kenrick